The Master and Margarita (Mistrz i Małgorzata) is a Polish television production of Polish Film Producers Teams (Zespoły Polskich Producentów Filmowych), based on the novel by Mikhail Bulgakov.

Background
Director and screenwriter of this adaptation is Maciej Wojtyszko.

The story

Three layers
The film is an adaptation of the novel  The Master and Margarita written by the Russian author Mikhail Bulgakov. Three storylines are interwoven.
 The first one is a satire of the ‘30s in the 20th century, the period during which Joseph Stalin is in power in the Soviet Union. The demon Woland comes to Moscow to have his annual Spring Ball of the Full Moon. Together with his demonic suite, he challenges the corrupt lucky ones, bureaucrats and profiteers of that period in an hilarious way..
 The second one is set in the biblical Yershalaim, and describes the inner struggle of Pontius Pilate before, during and after the conviction and execution of  Yeshua Ha Nozri.
 The third one tells the love story between a nameless writer in Moscow in the ’30s and his lover Margarita. The Master has written a novel on Pontius Pilate, a subject which was taboo in the officially atheistic Soviet Union.

Differences with the novel
This series follows faithfully the storyline of Bulgakov's original novel, except for the nighttime scenes. While many scenes in Bulgakov's novel are playing in the dark, it's always daytime in this adaptation. Due to the limited budget, Wojtyszko said he had focused on good acting rather than on special effects. At least one character was 'added' by the staff of Mr. Wojtyszko to the number appearing in the original novel by Bulgakov - i. e. a 'Ms. Karaulina' (featured by Ms. K. Sienkiewicz [1935-2017]) - a 'mother' (as she describes herself at the Griboyedov) and a writer, who 'wrote five kolkhoz novels in sixteen years with no leave', whose 'windows face a WC' and who is 'chased around the flat by a lunatic with axt'. As well, Anna Richardovna (featured by Ms. M. Zawadzka, b. 1944) is falsely described at the end of Part 2 as 'the secretary to Proleshnev' actually being one to Prokhor Petrovich.

Episodes
1. The Black Magic Séance
2. The Master
3. Margarita
4. Saying goodbye

Credits
 Director: Maciej Wojtyszko
 Screenplay: Maciej Wojtyszko
 Production: CWPiFTV Poltel (Warszawa)
 Camera:

Main cast
 Margarita: Anna Dymna
 Master: Władysław Kowalski 
 Woland: Gustaw Holoubek
 Bezdomny: 
 Pontius Pilate: Zbigniew Zapasiewicz
 Koroviev: Janusz Michałowski
 Azazello: Mariusz Benoit
 Yeshua: Tadeusz Bradecki
 Behemoth: Zbigniew Zamachowski

Soundtrack
All tracks composed by Zbigniew Karnecki

Other screen adaptations of The Master and Margarita
Charlotte Waligòra - Le maître et Marguerite - 2017 (film)
Giovanni Brancale - Il Maestro e Margherita - 2008 (film)
Vladimir Bortko - Master i Margarita - 2005 (TV series)
Ibolya Fekete - A Mester és Margarita - 2005 (film)
Sergey Desnitsky - Master i Margarita - 1996 (film)
Yuri Kara - Master i Margarita - 1994 (film)
Paul Bryers - Incident in Judea - 1991 (TV-film)
Oldřich Daněk - Pilát Pontský, onoho dne - 1991 (film)
Andras Szirtes - Forradalom Után - 1990 (film)
Aleksandr Dzekun  - Master i Margarita - 1989 (TV series)
Vladimir Vasilyev and Boris Yermolaev - Fuete - 1986 (film)
Aleksandar Petrović - Il Maestro e Margherita - 1972 (film)
Andrzej Wajda - Pilate and Others - 1972 (TV-film)
 - Pilatus - 1970 (TV-film)

To be expected
Logos Film Company - The Master and Margarita - 2018  (film)  
 - Mistr a Markétka - 2013 (animation film)
Nikolai Lebedev  - Master i Margarita - 2019 (film)

External links

 Oglądaj serial Mistrz i Małgorzata w Internecie
 serial Mistrz i Małgorzata w bazie filmweb.pl
 Mistrz i Małgorzata on the Master & Margarita website

Films based on The Master and Margarita
Portrayals of Jesus on television
Films set in the 1930s
Films set in Moscow
Television series set in the 1930s
Polish fantasy television series
Cultural depictions of Judas Iscariot
Cultural depictions of Pontius Pilate